Balu: ABCDEFG is a 2005 Indian Telugu-language crime action film written and directed by A. Karunakaran. This film stars Pawan Kalyan, Shriya, debutante Neha Oberoi and Gulshan Grover. The film was produced by C. Ashwini Dutt under his production company Vyjayanthi Movies. It's tag-line ABCDEFG stands for "A Boy Can Do Everything For a Girl." The film was released on 6 January 2005.

Plot
The story starts with a rowdy Daasanna, the follower of another uncontrollable, Naayudamma, warning the people of the Mahankali market. At the same time, Balu sets up a new flower stall in the market. He impresses Daasanna by making him believe that he worships Daasanna's mother, thereby getting relieved of the taxes set up by Daasanna. The people of the market get new hopes looking at Balu's style of impressing the rowdies. Balu newly comes to the city with his mother Rajeshwari Devi, sister-in-law, nephew and friend. As the story goes on, Balu meets Shwetha, but both start fighting with each other. One night Balu's mother walks to an empty bungalow. She faints there, remembering her past in which her husband Ranga Rao and her son would be killed because they supported the people of Mahankali market in getting the rights on the land. The next day Shwetha comes to the hospital to visit Balu's mother and falls in love with Balu. Shwetha dares to propose to Balu, but he rejects her love. On the other side, Balu, through Daasanna, tries to steal the documents of the Mahankali market, which are with Nayudamma at that time and are actually to be sold to Khan. Balu makes Nayudamma believe him by saving him from a planned bomb blast. When Khan arrives, he realizes Balu is none other than Ghani, who worked under him a few years back. The flashback unveils the story of Ghani, who changes because of Indu, who, in turn, changes, getting courage from Ghani. Ghani finally moves against Khan, who tries to kill children in an orphanage. Khan decides to kill Ghani and Indu. Ghani and Indu eventually reach Agra, Indu's hometown, where it is revealed that Rajeshwari Devi is actually Indu's mother. Indu changes Ghani's name to Balu. The next day Balu accepts Indu's love, but at the same time, Khan's rowdies kill Indu. Balu promises Indu that he would take care of her family and fight for people's rights on the Mahankali market. The scene returns to Balu lying in bed as he meets with an accident while driving because of his illness. He gets up and faces Khan, and Khan is finally killed in the fight. Finally, after 20 years, the people of the Mahankali market get the rights on the land.

Cast

 Pawan Kalyan as Ghani / "Balu" Balraj
 Shriya Saran as Swetha
 Neha Oberoi as "Indu" Indira Priyadarshini
 Gulshan Grover as Khan
 Jersey Singh as Nayudamma
 Saurabh Shukla as Khan's brief
 Brahmanandam as Taj Banjara Hotel Manager
 Jayasudha as Rajeshwari Devi
 Sunil as Balu's friend
 Suman as Ranga Rao, Indu's father
 Duvvasi Mohan as Ghani's gang member
 MS Narayana as Landlord
 Tanikella Bharani as Beggar
 Ananth Nag as Baba
 Jeeva as Police Officer
 Dharmavarapu Subramanyam as Pottaiah
 Gundu Hanumantha Rao as Store Manager
 Shankar Melkote as VISA Officer
 Naramalli Sivaprasad as Rajan
 Raghunatha Reddy
 Sajja Teja as Cherry
 Kavya Kalyan Ram
 Milind Gunaji in a cameo appearance

Music

The music and background score was composed by Mani Sharma. The soundtrack album consisted of 6 tracks. All the lyrics were written by Sirivennela Sitarama Sastry, Chandrabose, Jonnavithula & Nithin Raijwar. Songs Sung By Eminent Singers Like K. S. Chithra, Udit Narayan, Hariharan, Shreya Ghoshal, Sujatha Mohan, KK, Mahalakshmi Iyer, Kunal Ganjawala

Reception
A critic from Sify opined that "Pawan Kalyan and his remote controlled director Karunakaran has cooked up an unimaginative script etched from various films including the famous Baasha formula to churn out something that is not edible". Jeevi of Idlebrain wrote that "On the whole, Balu sums up to be a film you should watch to see Pawan Kalyan in a fresh radiant look". A critic from Full Hyderabad stated that "On the whole, passable fare, worth a visit".

References

External links
 

2005 films
2000s crime action films
2005 action films
Telugu films remade in other languages
Films directed by A. Karunakaran
2000s Telugu-language films
Indian crime action films